The British Academy Television Award for Best Short Form Programme is one of the major categories of the British Academy Television Awards (BAFTAs), the primary awards ceremony of the British television industry. According to the BAFTA website, the category is for "single shorts, short form series and shorts from a strand of any genre that have been commissioned and transmitted on a broadcast channel and/or online platform."

Winners and nominees

2010s

2020s

Note: The series that don't have recipients on the tables had Production team credited as recipients for the award or nomination.

References

External links
List of winners at the British Academy of Film and Television Arts

Short Form